Mehmand is a census town in Bilaspur district in the Indian state of Chhattisgarh.

Demographics
 India census, Mehmand had a population of 5765. Males constitute 52% of the population and females 48%. Mehmand has an average literacy rate of 53%, lower than the national average of 59.5%: male literacy is 66%, and female literacy is 39%. In Mehmand, 18% of the population is under 6 years of age.

References

Cities and towns in Bilaspur district, Chhattisgarh